Luis Brezzo Paredes(March 30, 1939 – September 20, 2002) was a Uruguayan politician belonging to the Colorado party. He was born in Montevideo, Uruguay on March 20, 1939, and studied engineering. He was employed in the banking sector, worked as a journalist, and was director of the Uruguay Association of Bank Employees (AEBU).

In 1994 and 1999 he was elected to the Senate of Uruguay. In 2000 president Jorge Batlle named him Minister of National Defense, where he served until his death on September 20, 2002.

References

1939 births
2002 deaths
People from Montevideo
Uruguayan people of Italian descent
Colorado Party (Uruguay) politicians
Defence ministers of Uruguay
Ministers of Labor and Social Affairs of Uruguay
Ministers of Livestock, Agriculture, and Fisheries of Uruguay